Iowa State Cyclones track and field represents Iowa State University (ISU) and competes in the Big 12 Conference of NCAA Division I. The team is coached by Martin Smith, he is currently in his 4th year at Iowa State. Originally, the men's and women's teams were considered separate; but beginning in the 2007 season the two teams were combined and are now operated as one single sport at the university. The Cyclones host their home indoor meets at Lied Recreational Facility and their home outdoor meets at the Cyclone Sports Complex, both are located on Iowa State's campus.

History

Men's

The Cyclones first put together a squad in 1921, competing in the Missouri Valley Conference.  They experienced their first success under head coach and former track standout Robert Simpson, he coached at ISU from 1926 to 1937. Simpson molded Iowa State's first track stars in Ray Conger and Ray Putnam who would go on to win individual NCAA Championships for the Mile Run in the 1927 and 1931 respectively.

After struggling for several decades the Cyclones reached new highs under Coach Bill Bergan.  The Cyclones had finished last or next to last in 21-straight Big Eight Conference outdoor meets before his arrival, under his leaderships they won 10 of 14 Big Eights Conference outdoor track championships. ISU athletes achieved All-America honors 104 times and captured 156 Big Eight individual titles under Bergan's direction. Three individual standouts from Bergan's squads were Danny Harris, Jonah Koech, and Jon Brown.  Harris was a three time NCAA champion in the 400 meter hurdles in 1984, 1985, and 1986.  Harris would then go on to win a silver medal representing the United States at the 1984 Los Angeles Olympics.  Hailing originally from Kenya, Jonah Koech is one of the most decorated athletes in Iowa State's history.  He was a member of six Big Eight championship squads as well as winning six individual conference titles. Koech's marquee event was the 5,000 meter run, where he won three NCAA Indoor Championships in 1990, 1991, and 1993. In addition to Jon Brown's 1992 NCAA Indoor Championship in the 5,000 meter run, he would go on to represent Great Britain in the 1996, 2000, and 2004 Olympic games.

After Bergan retired in 1994, the team would once again struggle to compete until the arrival of current head coach Martin Smith.  In Smith's four years the biggest individual success has been Edward Kemboi.  In 2015 Kemboi won NCAA titles for the 800 Meter Run in both the Indoor and Outdoor championships.

Women's

The Iowa State Women's Track and Field team first got their start in 1973 under Head Coach Chris Murray.  Their first individual success was Peg Neppel-Darrah when she won two AIAW titles at the 1976 AIAW Outdoor Championships in both the Two Mile and Three Mile run. Iowa State's most decorated track and field athlete wouldn't arrive until 1984 in Moroccan runner, Nawal El Moutawakel.  Competing in the 400 Meter Hurdles El Moutawakel won the 1984 Outdoor NCAA Championship and Olympic Gold representing her home country of Morocco. With her win she became the first Moroccan woman and first woman from a Muslim majority nation to win Olympic Gold.

Iowa State's most recent stars are Lisa Koll and Betsy Saina.  Koll is a four time NCAA champions.  In the 10,000 Meter Run she won the 2008 and 2010 Outdoor Championships and in the 5,000 Meter Run she won the 2010 Indoor Championship 2010 Outdoor Championship.  Koll would go on to represent the United States at the 2012 London Olympics in the 10,000 Meter Run.  While at Iowa State Betsy Saina won the 5,000 Meter Run at the 2012 Indoor NCAA Championship and the 10,000 Meter Run at the 2013 Outdoor NCAA Championship.  She would then go on to place fourth in the 10,000 Meter Run at the Rio Olympics.

Championships

Men's team championships

Women's team championships

Men's Indoor Individual NCAA Champions

Men's Outdoor Individual NCAA Champions

Women's Indoor Individual National Champions

Women's Outdoor Individual National Champions

Olympians

Facilities

Iowa State track athletes train and compete in one of the finest indoor facilities in the world. Iowa State's $13 million Lied Recreation-Athletic Facility complements Iowa State's outdoor track complex. The combination gives Cyclone track athletes first-rate, year-round practice facilities. The Lied Recreation-Athletic Facility was the site of the 1998, 2000 and 2007 Big 12 Indoor Track and Field Championships. The indoor facility includes a 300-meter track that is one of the largest and fastest indoor surfaces in the world. Over the summer of 1999 the track was resurfaced at a cost of over $600,000 with a mondo surface, showing ISU's commitment to being amongst the best in the nation.

Their home meets are held at the recently opened Cyclone Sports Complex. The $13 million facility opened in 2012.

References

External links
 

 
1859 establishments in Iowa